The HKTDC Trade Fairs are a series of international trade fairs held annually and organised by the Hong Kong Trade Development Council held at the Hong Kong Convention and Exhibition Centre in Hong Kong.

International Tea Fair
Its first edition was held August 2009 at the Hong Kong Convention and Exhibition Centre. The 2009 fair attracted over 250 exhibitors from 17 countries & regions, including mainland China, India, Sri Lanka and Taiwan. 
The fair is scheduled to coincide with the HKTDC Food Expo and International Conference & Exhibition of the Modernization of Chinese Medicine & Health Products in 2010.

Range of exhibits
 Tea
 Processed tea and tea product
 Tea packaging
 Tea processing equipment and testing service
 Tea ware
 Tea bar / organisation
 Tea technology
 Tea art
 Tea media

Education and Careers Expo

HKTDC Education & Careers Expo which started in 1990, is a platform organised by the Hong Kong Trade Development Council (HKTDC) which brings together bringing employers in contact with potential employees, and educators and professional bodies in contact with those looking to improve their skills and knowledge or to attain a professional qualification. The four-day-long fair is opened every year in the beginning of February at the Hong Kong Convention and Exhibition Centre.

The 2009 expo welcomed 514 exhibitors, including educational institutes – from outside as well as within Hong Kong – together with public and private sector employers. Participants came from far and wide, with exhibitors from 14 countries and regions: Australia, Canada, the Chinese mainland, France, Germany, Hong Kong, Italy, Macau, New Zealand, Singapore, Switzerland, Taiwan, the UK, and the US.

Major exhibit categories

Education
•	Colleges & Polytechnics 
•	Universities 
•	School for Continue Education 
•	Vocational Training 
•	Language Schools 
•	Outside Hong Kong Educational Institutions 
Careers
•	Government Departments 
•	Semi-government Organizations 
•	Professional Associations 
•	Private Enterprises 
Books, Stationery, Educational Supplies 
•	Book Publishers / Book Stores 
•	Learning Aids / Educational Equipment

Baby Products Fair
The Hong Kong Baby Products Fair is an annual trade fair organised by the Hong Kong Trade Development Council (HKTDC), with its first edition scheduled for January 2010. It is a spin-off event from the HKTDC Hong Kong Toys & Games Fair, the second largest fair of its kind in the world and the biggest in Asia. The new Baby Products Fair will presents nearly 300 exhibitors and will feature group pavilions representing the Chinese mainland, Taiwan and Thailand.

The fair coincides with the HKTDC Hong Kong Toys & Games Fair, Hong Kong International Stationery Fair and HKTDC Hong Kong International Licensing Show, which give a broader market overview and provide opportunities for buyers with specialist interests.

Range of exhibits
Baby wear and footwear
Strollers and gear
Skincare and bath products
Feeding and nursery products
Bedding and furniture
Baby toys and activities
Gift sets
Maternity products

Hong Kong Toys and Games Fair
The HKTDC Hong Kong Toys & Games Fair is the largest toy industry event in Asia and the second largest in the world. Organised by the Hong Kong Trade Development Council (HKTDC), it is held annually in January in Hong Kong, China, featuring over 2,000 international exhibitors and catering to the needs of buyers from around the world. Exhibits include educational toys & games, hobby goods, magic items, outdoor & sporting items, paper products & toy packaging, video games, along with Brand Name Gallery for branded toys.

Peripheral activities include information events, such as seminars and the Product Demo and Launching Pad, as well as social networking occasions. The event is concurrent with the Hong Kong International Stationery Fair the HKTDC Hong Kong International Licensing Show and the HKTDC Hong Kong Baby Products Fair. This enlarges the scope for sourcing and presents more opportunities for productive business partnerships. It incorporates elements of the discontinued HKTDC Summer Sourcing Show for Gifts, Houseware & Toys.

Major exhibit categories
Candy Toys, Educational Toys & Games, Electronic & Remote Control Toys, 
Hobby Goods, Magic Items, Multiple Products/ General Merchandise, Outdoor & Sporting Items, Paper Products & Toy Packaging, Party Items, Toy Parts & Accessories, Soft Toys & Dolls, Vehicles, Mechanical Toys & Action Figures, Video Games

Hong Kong International Stationery Fair
Co-organized by the Hong Kong Trade Development Council (HKTDC) and Messe Frankfurt (HK) Ltd., the Hong Kong International Stationery Fair  is held annually in January in Hong Kong, China, offering a range of stationery and back-to-school items, including artist's supplies, children's stationery, office equipment, educational systems, gift stationery, writing instruments and many more.

The event is concurrent with the HKTDC Hong Kong Toys & Games Fair and the HKTDC Hong Kong International Licensing Show . This enlarges the scope for sourcing and presents more opportunities for productive business partnerships.

Major exhibit categories

Artist's Supplies, Children’ Stationery & School Supplies, Computer Peripherals & Related Accessories, Consumables for Office Equipment 
Gift Stationery, Office Equipment, Paper & Printing Products, Writing Equipment

World Boutique
World Boutique, Hong Kong is organised by the Hong Kong Trade Development Council (HKTDC) and held concurrently with the Hong Kong Fashion Week during at the Hong Kong Convention and Exhibition Centre in January every year. It showcases the latest branded fashion products, designers' collections, fashion accessories, home fashion, and lifestyle products and small gifts.

References

External links
 
 
 

Trade fairs in Hong Kong